Wadsworth Barracks is an Australian Army base in the  suburb of Bandiana, located about  to the east of Wodonga, Victoria.

References

Barracks in Australia